Flat Rock Park is an unincorporated community in Columbus Township, Bartholomew County, in the U.S. state of Indiana.

History
The community took its name from the Flatrock River nearby.

Geography

References

Unincorporated communities in Bartholomew County, Indiana
Unincorporated communities in Indiana